The Perfect World Foundation is a non-governmental organisation that raises awareness and supports efforts to prevent the global ecological crisis. The organization was founded by Ragnhild Jacobsson and Lars Valentin Jacobsson in 2010. The organization conducts ten annual events as part of its strategic plan "The Final Count Down". The events commenced in 2020 with the "Climate Aid" event in Gothenburg, Sweden.

In 2014, Perfect World's "Save The Rhino" event in Gothenburg was the first large-scale fundraising event in support of wildlife to take place in Scandinavia. It attracted five hundred paying guests, was supported by one hundred volunteers and was attended by Victoria, Crown Princess of Sweden.

The Perfect World Award 

The Perfect World Award is given annually, by The Perfect World Foundation, to a person who has raised significant attention to wildlife and nature conservation. Since its inauguration in 2014, it has become one of the most prestigious conservation award in Scandinavia. The recipient also receives The Fragile Rhino prize, a rhinoceros sculpted in glass.  In her role as ambassador for The Perfect World Foundation, Sarah, Duchess of York has presented the award since 2017.The recipients to date have been:

References 

Environmental organizations based in Sweden
Environmental organizations established in 2010
Nature conservation organisations based in Europe
Organizations based in Gothenburg